Janine Rankin (born 3 June 1972) is a Canadian gymnast. She competed at the 1988 Summer Olympics and the 1992 Summer Olympics.

Eponymous skill
Rankin has one eponymous skill listed in the Code of Points.

References

External links
 

1972 births
Living people
Canadian female artistic gymnasts
Olympic gymnasts of Canada
Gymnasts at the 1988 Summer Olympics
Gymnasts at the 1992 Summer Olympics
People from Weston, Toronto
Gymnasts from Toronto
Originators of elements in artistic gymnastics